FC Queens Park are a football team based in Caia Park, Wrexham, Wales, currently playing in the North East Wales Football League Premier Division.

History

FC Queens Park were formed in 2013. In their first season they entered the Clwyd East League, a competition which they won at the first attempt and were subsequently promoted. Further success followed when they won the 2014–15 Welsh National League First Division, and again achieved promotion. FC Queens Park adapted well to life in Welsh National League Premier Division when they finished 3rd in 2015–16. In the 2016–17 season the club achieved their third promotion in four season when they became champions of Welsh National League Premier Division. They were promoted to play in the Cymru Alliance for the 2017–18 season.

The club joined the newly formed North East Wales Football League in 2020 as a Premier Division club.

League history

Cup history

Honours

League
Welsh National League Premier Division
Winner (1): 2016–17
Third (1): 2015–16

Welsh National League Division One
Winner (1): 2014–15

Clwyd East Football League
Winner (1): 2013–14

Cups
North East Wales FA Challenge Cup

Runner-Up (1): 2017

Welsh National League Division One League Cup
Winner (1): 2015

North East Wales FA Junior (Horace Wynne) Cup 
Winner (2): 2013–14, 2021–22

Notes
Also see GAP Queens Park, who folded in 2008 after playing the Cymru Alliance.

References

Association football clubs established in 2013
Football clubs in Wrexham
2013 establishments in Wales
Sport in Wrexham
Sport in Wrexham County Borough
Cymru Alliance clubs
North East Wales Football League clubs
Clwyd East Football League clubs